Stanisław Jankowski (code name: "Agaton") was an SOE agent and Polish resistance fighter during World War II, and an architect thereafter, who played a prominent role in the post-war reconstruction of Warsaw.

Life
Jankowski was a student and later, assistant lecturer in architecture at the Warsaw University of Technology in the Second Polish Republic before World War II. He was mobilized as an officer during the German invasion of Poland of 1939. He was captured by the Soviets in eastern Poland but escaped and joined the Polish Armed Forces in the West. Jankowski became an SOE agent (Cichociemny) and in 1942 was parachuted back into occupied Poland, where he became an expert document forger (codename "Agaton", helped set up the Home Army's document forgery department, codenamed "Agaton section") for the Polish resistance. In 1944, he took part in the Warsaw Uprising (commander of 'Agaton Platoon', member of the Batalion Pięść in the Radosław Group). He was taken prisoner by the Germans. After the end of the Uprising, he became an aide-de-camp to General Tadeusz Bór-Komorowski, the leader of the Polish Home Army. After the war, he resumed his career as an architect. He took part in the reconstruction of Warsaw; many of his projects took him abroad (to Iraq, Peru, Yugoslavia and Vietnam).

Autobiography
 Stanisław Jankowski 'Agaton' (1980). Z fałszywym Ausweisem w prawdziwej Warszawie: Wspomnienia 1939-1946. Warszawa: Biblioteka Syrenki (memoires)

Honours and awards
Jankowski was the recipient of many military and civilian medals and awards:
 Virtuti Militari
 Cross of Valour, twice
 Order of the Banner of Labour Class II
 Knight's Cross of the Order of Polonia Restituta
 Home Army Cross
 three National Arts Awards
 Gold Medal for Reconstruction of Warsaw
 Honorary Citizen of Warsaw (1995)

Notes and references

1911 births
2002 deaths
Artists from Warsaw
People from Warsaw Governorate
Warsaw University of Technology alumni
Academic staff of the Warsaw University of Technology
Home Army members
Cichociemni
Recipients of the Virtuti Militari
Recipients of the Cross of Valour (Poland)
Recipients of the Order of the Banner of Work
Knights of the Order of Polonia Restituta
Recipients of the Armia Krajowa Cross
Warsaw Uprising insurgents
20th-century Polish architects